The crowned shrew or Millet's shrew (Sorex coronatus) is a species of mammal in the family Soricidae. It is found in Austria, Belgium, France, Germany, Liechtenstein, the Netherlands, Spain, Switzerland, and the British island of Jersey. It is almost indistinguishable from the common shrew, its habitatal preferences and habits are identical. However it has a different karyotype, is slightly smaller, and has small morphological differences, such as a longer rostrum (upper tooth-row and mandible) relative to length of skull.

References

 Complete British Animals. Collins. Paul Sterry.

Sorex
Taxonomy articles created by Polbot
Mammals described in 1828
Taxa named by Pierre-Aimé Millet